Aurangabad is a nagar panchayat, a town that has rapidly transitioned from rural to urban. It is located in the Bulandshahr district of the Indian state of Uttar Pradesh. Aurangabad is inherited by sayeds of aurangabad. Sayeds of aurangabad win it undern mughal empire, During Aurangzeb Alamgir . pir Abdul Aziz Sahab (R.A) he was the pir of Aurangzeb Alamgir . Aurangzeb's grave is near his grave which is situated in Maharashtra Aurangabad. Aurangabad sayeds was the great pirs. Aurangabad sayeds have nearly 400 villages and also Delhi in it.

Location and landmarks
Aurangabad is located at coordinates: .
The town lies on the state highway connecting Bulandshahr and Garhmukteshwar. Aurangabad is surrounded by the villages of Hingthala Bhawsi, Sega Jagatpur, Saidpur, and Lakhaoti. The market is divided into 15 wards.

At the old center of Aurangabad is a Nageshwar Mahadev temple.

Trade
Aurangabad is part of a growing potato belt and other vegetables  have many cold storage facilities. Aurangabad having mango orchids. Anamika Sugar Mill is a hub for sugarcane farmers.

Demographics
According to the 2001 Indian census, Aurangabad had a population of 20,072. Males constitute 53% of the population and females 47%. Aurangabad has an average literacy rate of 43%, lower than the national average of 59.5%, with the male literacy rate at 55% and female literacy at 30.5%. 19% of the population is under 6 years of age.

References

Cities and towns in Bulandshahr district